{| 
{{Infobox ship image
| Ship image =SMS Schlesien BainNews.jpg
| Ship caption = SMS Hannovers sister ship 
}}

|}SMS Hannover''' ("His Majesty's Ship Hannover") was the second of five  pre-dreadnought battleships of the German Imperial Navy (Kaiserliche Marine). Hannover and the three subsequently constructed ships differed slightly from the lead ship  in their propulsion systems and slightly thicker armor. Hannover was laid down in November 1904, launched in May 1905, and commissioned into the High Seas Fleet in October 1907. The ships of her class were already outdated by the time they entered service, being inferior in size, armor, firepower, and speed to the revolutionary new British battleship .Hannover and her sister ships saw extensive service with the fleet. The ship took part in all major training maneuvers until World War I broke out in July 1914. Hannover and her sisters were immediately pressed into guard duties at the mouth of the Elbe River while the rest of the fleet mobilized. The ship took part in several fleet advances, which culminated in the Battle of Jutland on 31May1June 1916. During the battle, Hannover served as the flagship for IVDivision of IIBattle Squadron; she was not heavily engaged during the battle, nor was she damaged by enemy fire. After the battle, which exposed the weakness of pre-dreadnoughts like Hannover, she and her three surviving sisters were removed from active duty with the fleet to serve as guard ships. Hannover served in this capacity for the remainder of the war, first in the Elbe and, starting in 1917, in the Danish straits. She was decommissioned in December 1918, shortly after the end of the war.

The ship was brought back to active service in the Reichsmarine, the post-war German navy. She served with the fleet for ten years, from 1921 to 1931, during which time she took part in several major overseas cruises to Spain and the Mediterranean Sea. Hannover was again decommissioned in September 1931; the navy planned to convert the ship into a radio-controlled target ship, but this was never carried out and she was instead used in explosive tests. Hannover was ultimately broken up for scrap between 1944 and 1946 in Bremerhaven. Her bell is preserved at the Military History Museum of the Bundeswehr in Dresden.

 Design 

The passage of the Second Naval Law in 1900 under the direction of Vizeadmiral (VAdmVice Admiral) Alfred von Tirpitz secured funding for the construction of twenty new battleships over the next seventeen years. The Deutschland-class ships were broadly similar to the Braunschweigs and featured incremental improvements in armor protection. They also abandoned the gun turrets for the secondary battery guns, moving them back to traditional casemates to save weight. The British battleship armed with ten 12-inch (30.5 cm) gunswas commissioned in December 1906. She displaced  at full loading. The ship was equipped with two heavy military masts. Her crew numbered 35 officers and 708 enlisted men. Steam was provided by twelve Schulz-Thornycroft boilers; three funnels vented smoke from burning coal in the boilers. HHer offensive armament was rounded out with a secondary battery of fourteen  SK L/40 guns mounted individually in casemates. A battery of twenty-two  SK L/45 guns in single mounts provided defense against torpedo boats. The ship was also armed with six  torpedo tubes, all submerged in the hull. One was in the bow, one in the stern, and four on the broadside. Krupp cemented armor protected the ship. The main battery turrets had  of armor plating.

 Service 
Peacetime

Funds for the construction of a second member of the Deutschland class were included in the 1904 budget. The contract for the new vessel was awarded to the Kaiserliche Werft (Imperial Shipyard) in Wilhelmshaven on 1June 1904 under the contract name "P", which denoted an addition to the fleet. Hannover was laid down on 7November. The experiences of the Russo-Japanese War, then being fought, suggested that naval armor was too thin to protect against modern guns, and so the German designers increased the thickness of the main belt and the central citadel; this change was repeated in the three subsequent members of the class. The ship was launched on 29May 1905, and the President of the Province of Hanover, Richard von Wentzel, gave the speech. After completing fitting-out, the ship was commissioned for sea trials on 1October 1907, but they were interrupted so that Hannover could join the fleet exercises in the Skagerrak in November. Trials resumed after the maneuvers were completed, and by 13February 1908 Hannover was ready to join the active fleet.

From May to June 1908, Hannover took part in maneuvers in the North Sea. From the following month until August, the fleet conducted a training cruise into the Atlantic. During the cruise, Hannover stopped in Ponta Delgada in the Azores, part of Portugal, from 23July to 1August. The annual autumn exercises began in September; after these were completed, Hannover was transferred to ISquadron, where she served as the flagship for two years. In November, fleet and unit exercises were conducted in the Baltic Sea.

The training regimen in which Hannover participated followed a similar pattern over the next five years. This included another cruise into the Atlantic, from 7July to 1August 1909, followed immediately by the annual autumn maneuvers in August and September. On 1October, VAdm Hugo von Pohl replaced Holtzendorff as the squadron commander aboard Hannover. The squadron conducted exercises in February 1910, and on 1April the unit was transferred from Kiel to Wilhelmshaven. Westfalen also replaced Hannover as the squadron's flagship; she later replaced Wittelsbach as the flagship of the squadron's deputy commander, Konteradmiral (KAdmRear Admiral) Günther von Krosigk. The ship won the Kaiser's Schießpreis (Shooting Prize) for excellent gunnery in ISquadron after the annual maneuvers. The squadron ended the year with further exercises in the Baltic and the Kattegat in October and November.

Krosigk was replaced by KAdm Karl Zimmerman in January 1911. Hannover took part in fleet maneuvers in the North Sea in May, a fleet cruise to Norwegian waters in July and early August, and the annual maneuvers in August and September. The dreadnought , which had by then joined the squadron, replaced Hannover as the deputy command flagship on 3October, and the dreadnought  took her place in the squadron, allowing Hannover to be transferred back to IISquadron, based in Kiel. She took part in training with IISquadron in November and from February through April 1912. She then took s place as the deputy command flagship on 27April, and KAdm Ehrhard Schmidt hoisted his flag aboard the ship that day. Fleet maneuvers in the North and Baltic Seas followed. Because of the Agadir Crisis with Britain and France, the summer cruise in July went only to the Baltic to avoid exposing the fleet to a possible attack. The autumn maneuvers took place as usual in August and September, after which KAdm Wilhelm von Souchon replaced Schmidt.

The year 1913 followed a pattern similar to 1912, though the summer cruise returned to Norway that year. After the autumn maneuvers, Souchon was relieved by Kapitän zur See (KzSCaptain at Sea)  so he could be sent to command the Mediterranean Division. Hannover joined the rest of the fleet for maneuvers in the Baltic in November that year. The year 1914 began as previous years had, with squadron training. On 14July, the annual summer cruise to Norway began. The threat of war during the July Crisis caused Kaiser WilhelmII to end the cruise early, after only two weeks, and by the end of July the fleet was back in port, preparing for hostilities. At midnight on 4August, the United Kingdom declared war on Germany for violating Belgium's neutrality.

 World War I 
Following the outbreak of World War I, Hannover was tasked with guard duty in the Altenbruch roadstead at the mouth of the Elbe River during the period of mobilization for the rest of the fleet. In late October, the ships were sent to Kiel to have modifications made to their underwater protection systems to make them more resistant to torpedoes and mines. Hannover then joined the battleship support for the battlecruisers that bombarded Scarborough, Hartlepool, and Whitby on 15–16 December 1914. During the operation, the German battle fleet of 12 dreadnoughts and eight pre-dreadnoughts came within  of an isolated squadron of six British battleships. However, skirmishes between the rival destroyer screens in the darkness convinced the German fleet commander, VAdm Friedrich von Ingenohl, that the entire Grand Fleet was deployed before him. Under orders from Wilhelm II to avoid battle if victory was not certain, Ingenohl broke off the engagement and turned the battle fleet back towards Germany.Hannover put to sea during the Battle of Dogger Bank on 24January 1915 to support the beleaguered German battlecruisers, but quickly returned to port. On 17–18 April, Hannover supported a minelaying operation off the Swarte Bank by the light cruisers of IIReconnaissance Group. A fleet advance to the Dogger Bank followed on 21–22 April. On 16May, Hannover was sent to Kiel to have one of her 28 cm guns replaced. The ship returned to Kiel on 28June to have supplemental oil firing installed for her boilers; work lasted until 12July. KzS Gottfried von Dalwigk zu Lichtenfels replaced Mauve on 11August, raising his flag aboard Hannover on the 20th. On 11–12 September, IIReconnaissance Group conducted another minelaying operation off the Swarte Bank with Hannover and the rest of IISquadron in support. This was followed by another fruitless sweep by the fleet on 23–24 October. During the fleet advance of 5–7 March 1916, Hannover and the rest of IISquadron remained in the German Bight, ready to sail in support. They then rejoined the fleet during the operation to bombard Yarmouth and Lowestoft on 24–25 April. During this operation, the battlecruiser  was damaged by a British mine and had to return to port prematurely. Visibility was poor, so the operation was quickly called off before the British fleet could intervene.

 Battle of Jutland 

Admiral Reinhard Scheer, the commander of the German fleet, immediately planned another advance into the North Sea, but the damage to Seydlitz delayed the operation until the end of May. Hannover was the flagship in IVDivision of IIBattle Squadron, which was positioned at the rear of the German line. IIBattle Squadron was commanded by Mauve. On 31 May, at 02:00 CET, Hipper's battlecruisers steamed out towards the Skagerrak, followed by the rest of the High Seas Fleet an hour and a half later. During the "Run to the North", Scheer ordered the fleet to pursue the retreating battleships of the British VBattle Squadron at top speed. Hannover and her sisters were significantly slower than the faster dreadnoughts and quickly fell behind. During this period, Scheer directed Hannover to place herself at the rear of the German line, so he would have a flagship on either end of the formation. By 19:30, the Grand Fleet had arrived on the scene and confronted Scheer with significant numerical superiority. The German fleet was severely hampered by the presence of the slower Deutschland-class ships; if Scheer ordered an immediate turn towards Germany, he would have to sacrifice the slower ships to make good his escape.

Scheer decided to reverse the course of the fleet with the Gefechtskehrtwendung, a maneuver that required every unit in the German line to turn 180° simultaneously. As a result of their having fallen behind, the ships of IIBattle Squadron could not conform to the new course following the turn. Hannover and the other five ships of the squadron were, therefore, located on the disengaged side of the German line. Mauve considered moving his ships to the rear of the line, astern of IIIBattle Squadron dreadnoughts, but decided against it when he realized the movement would interfere with the maneuvering of Admiral Franz von Hipper's battlecruisers. Instead, he attempted to place his ships at the head of the line.

Later on the first day of the battle, the hard-pressed battlecruisers of IScouting Group were being pursued by their British opponents. Hannover and the other so-called "five-minute ships" came to their aid by steaming in between the opposing battlecruiser squadrons. The ships were only very briefly engaged, owing in large part to the poor visibility. Hannover fired eight rounds from her 28 cm guns during this period. The British battlecruiser  fired on Hannover several times until the latter was obscured by smoke. Hannover was struck once by fragments from one of the  shells fired by Princess Royal. Mauve decided it would be inadvisable to continue the fight against the much more powerful battlecruisers, and so ordered an 8-point turn to starboard.

Late on the 31st, the fleet organized for the night voyage back to Germany; Deutschland, Pommern, and Hannover fell in behind  and the other dreadnoughts of IIIBattle Squadron towards the rear of the line. Hessen situated herself between Hannover and Pommern, while the other two ships fell in at the rear of the line. Shortly after 01:00, the leading ships of the German line came into contact with the armored cruiser , which was quickly destroyed in a hail of gunfire from the German dreadnoughts. Nassau was forced to fall out of line to avoid the sinking British ship, and an hour later rejoined the formation directly ahead of Hannover. At around 03:00, British destroyers conducted a series of attacks against the fleet, some of which targeted Hannover. Shortly thereafter, Pommern was struck by at least one torpedo from the destroyer ; the hit detonated an ammunition magazine which destroyed the ship in a tremendous explosion. Hannover was astern of Pommern and was forced to turn hard to starboard to avoid the wreck. Simultaneously, a third torpedo from Onslaught passed closely astern of Hannover, which forced the ship to turn away. Hannover and several other ships again fired at imaginary submarines shortly before 06:00.

Despite the ferocity of the night fighting, the High Seas Fleet punched through the British destroyer forces and reached Horns Reef by 04:00 on 1June. Over the course of the battle, Hannover had fired eight 28 cm shells, twenty-one 17 cm rounds, and forty-four shells from her 8.8 cm guns. She emerged from the battle completely unscathed.

 Later actions 
The experience at Jutland convinced Scheer that the pre-dreadnoughts of IISquadron could no longer be used as front-line battleships. Accordingly, they were detached from the High Seas Fleet and returned to guard duty in the Elbe. Now-KAdm Dalwigk zuLichtenfels hauled down his flag on 30November and a replacement was not appointed, though IISquadron remained in at least administrative existence until 15August 1917. In the meantime, Hannover went to Kiel for maintenance on 4November 1916 before resuming guard ship duties in the Elbe. From 10February to 23April 1917, she served as the flagship for VAdm Hubert von Rebeur-Paschwitz. During this period, on 21March, the ship had some of her guns removed. From 25June to 16September, she was rebuilt to serve as a guard ship in the Danish straits; she began serving in this role on 27September, replacing the battleship .

Acts of insubordination began aboard the ship on 4November 1918, as a wider mutiny aboard the High Seas Fleet spread from Wilhelmshaven to Kiel. On 11November, Germany entered into the armistice with the Western Allies. According to the terms of the armistice, the most modern components of Germany's surface fleet were interned in the British naval base at Scapa Flow, while the rest of the fleet was demilitarized. On the day the armistice took effect, Hannover was sent briefly to Swinemünde, before returning to Kiel on 14–15November along with Schlesien. Hannover was decommissioned a month later on 17December in accordance with the terms of the armistice.

 Postwar service 
Following the German defeat in World War I, the German navy was reorganized as the Reichsmarine according to the Treaty of Versailles. The new navy was permitted to retain eight pre-dreadnought battleships under Article 181two of which would be in reservefor coastal defense. This amounted to three of the Deutschland-class battleships—Hannover, Schleswig-Holstein and Schlesien—as well as the five Braunschweig-class battleships. Hannover was modernized between 1920 and 1921 to prepare her for active service with the fleet. On 10February 1921, she was recommissioned as the flagship of the Commander of the Naval Forces of the Baltic Sea, KzS und Kommodore (KzS and Commodore) Hugo von Rosenberg. The unit was based in Swinemünde, and at the time it also included the light cruiser , the survey ship , and ITorpedo-boat Flotilla. In June and July, the unit held the first major post-war exercises in the western Baltic. Later that year, Hannover visited Gotland. In March 1922, Hannover was tasked with clearing paths in the heavy sea ice in the eastern Baltic. On 1April, she and the rest of the unit were transferred to Kiel. During night-fighting exercises on 23May, Hannover collided with the torpedo boat S18, killing ten men aboard the torpedo boat. Later that year, during the summer training cruise, Hannover visited several ports in Finland, and in September she took part in major training exercises. She visited Stockholm from 18 to 22October, where Rosenberg was received by Gustaf V of Sweden.

In 1923, Hannover visited Örnsköldsvik and Karlskrona in Sweden. She lost her role as flagship on 22September, and the fleet was reorganized from North Sea and Baltic Sea commands to create the Battleship Division, to which Hannover was assigned. In mid-1924, the Battleship Division made its first major overseas cruise to Spain, and Hannover stopped in Portugalete from 6 to 13July. Paul Behncke, the commander of the Reichsmarine, came aboard the ship during the autumn maneuvers in August and September, which concluded with a fleet review off Hel, Poland, on 10September. While enroute from Wilhelmshaven to Kiel in December, Hannover collided with a tugboat that had been torn from its moorings. Hannover was damaged in the accident and water flooded the engine room, forcing her to return to Wilhelmshaven for repairs that lasted until February 1925. The fleet cruised Norwegian waters during the summer cruise and visited Oslo and Ulvik, and in September the ships conducted training in the North Sea. On 1October, Hannover once again became a flagship, this time for the 2ndAdmiral of the Battleship Division, KzS und Kommodore Wilhelm Prentzel. At that time, the active German fleet consisted of Hannover, Braunschweig, the light cruiser , and IITorpedo-boat Flotilla.Hannover took part in several major cruises in 1926, the first of which, from 13May to 18June, went to Spain and the Mediterranean Sea. She visited the Spanish ports of Palma in Majorca, Cartagena, and Vigo during the cruise. The second cruise took place from 28June to 1July, and took the ship to Helsingfors, Finland. From 4 to 5September, the fleet cruised in the Skagen, before beginning another Atlantic cruise on 11October. During the voyage, Hannover stopped in Funchal, Las Palmas, Porto de Preia, Santa Cruz de la Palma, Villagarcia, and Amsterdam. The fleet returned to Germany on 16December, and on 1March 1927, Hannover was decommissioned for modernization and repairs, her place in the active fleet being taken by Schlesien. The ship received a new mast, but unlike her sisters kept her original three funnels. She was recommissioned on 25January 1930 and rejoined the Battleship Division. She took part in the cruise to the Mediterranean that began on 2April. She made stops in Vigo, Valencia, Messina, Athens, Argostolion, Palma deMallorca, and Cádiz before arriving back in Wilhelmshaven on 18June.Hannover took part in a large fleet parade in the Baltic on 20May 1931 for President Paul von Hindenburg. She made her last trip abroad in June, when she visited Bergen, Norway. She participated in the autumn maneuvers that year, which concluded with a naval review for the outgoing fleet commander, VAdm Iwan Oldekop, on 11September. During the maneuvers, Erich Raeder, the chief of the Reichsmarine, came aboard the ship. The ship thereafter went to Kiel, where she was decommissioned on 25September. The ship was struck from the naval register in 1936, after which the navy intended to rebuild Hannover'' for use as a target ship. The conversion never occurred. Instead, she was used in explosive tests. Ultimately, the ship was broken up between May 1944 and October 1946 in Bremerhaven. Her bell now resides in the Military History Museum of the Bundeswehr in Dresden.

Footnotes

Notes

Citations

References

Further reading

 
 
 

Deutschland-class battleships
Ships built in Wilhelmshaven
1905 ships
World War I battleships of Germany